Serafimovsky is a rural locality (a selo) and the administrative centre of Serafimovsky Selsoviet, Tuymazinsky District, Bashkortostan, Russia. The population was 9,813 as of 2010. There are 67 streets.

Geography 
Serafimovsky is located 23 km south of Tuymazy (the district's administrative centre) by road. Serafimovka is the nearest rural locality.

References 

Rural localities in Tuymazinsky District